Aleșd is a town in Bihor County, western Romania. It administers three villages: Pădurea Neagră (Feketeerdő), Peștiș (Sólyomkőpestes), and Tinăud (Tinód).

Geography
The town is located in the east of the county, near the border with Cluj County, at the foot of the Apuseni Mountains. It lies on the banks of the river Crișul Repede, where the Vadu Crișului – Aștileu Canal connects with the river. The river Izvor flows into the Crișul Repede near Aleșd; the river Secătura flows into the Izvor in Peștiș village.

Aleșd is located on the CFR main railway line between Oradea and Bucharest. Consequently, it is served by frequent rapid and intercity (IC) trains from Cluj-Napoca, Bucharest, Arad, and Timișoara.

History
At first Aleșd was on the shores of the Crișul Repede River (meaning ”The fast river”), in its floodplain. In the first half of the 18th century, the population moved to the terrace on the right bank of the Crișul Repede, in the place that it occupies today. The move was made to escape the frequent floods.

After the break-up of Austria-Hungary at the end of World War I, the Hungarian town passed under Romanian administration during the Hungarian–Romanian War of 1919, and became part of the Kingdom of Romania in April 1920. As a result of the Second Vienna Award, it was returned to Hungary in August 1940, staying under Hungarian administration until October 1944, towards the end of World War II. Aleșd was declared a town in 1968.

Population

Aleșd has a population of 9,619 (2011 census), made up of Romanians (63.9%), Hungarians (16.04%), Roma (12.73%), Slovaks (6.59%), and others (0.42%).

Administration
The town of Aleșd is run by a mayor and a local council composed of 17 councilors. The mayor, Ioan Coloman Todoca, from the National Liberal Party, was elected in 2016.

Notable residents
Zsolt Bodoni, painter who lives in Oradea and was born in 1975 in Aleșd.
Miklós Radnóti (1909–1944), poet and teacher who served his labor draft during World War II in Aleșd.

Gallery

References

Populated places in Bihor County
Localities in Crișana
Towns in Romania